Phymatarum is a genus of flowering plants in the family Araceae. It contains only one known species, Phymatarum borneense, native to Brunei and Sarawak on the Island of Borneo.

References

Aroideae
Monotypic Araceae genera
Endemic flora of Borneo